Fray is a surname. Fray is a surname derived from the German word 'frei' which means 'free'. Ancestry of Fray can be traced to Ashkenazic Jews from Europe. Other variations include Frayr, Frayer, Frayda, Frayman, Frayberg, Frey, Freyr, Freyda, Freyman, Freyberg, Freiman, Freeman. 

Notable people with the name include:
Arron Fray (born 1987), English soccer player
Daniella Fray (born 1990),  British actress, screenwriter and producer
David Fray (born 1981), French classical pianist
Derek Fray FRS, British material scientist and professor
Sir John Fray (died 1461), English lawyer and court official
Terryn Fray (born 1991), Bermudan cricketer
Tom Fray (born 1979), English cricketer

In fiction
Melaka Fray, protagonist in the Fray comic book series
Clary Fray, protagonist in The Mortal Instruments book series and popular Netflix show Shadowhunters by Cassandra Clare

References

Other versions of Fray:
Freyr
Frey (surname)

Surnames from status names